The Old Masters is a box set series by Frank Zappa, released in three volumes on Barking Pumpkin Records from April 1985 to December 1987, consisting of studio and live albums by Zappa and The Mothers of Invention originally released from 1966 to 1976 on other labels, as well as "Mystery Discs" which contained previously unreleased material. The graphics (not including the photo inserts) on all three sets was airbrush illustrated by Larry Grossman.

The box sets contained new masters mixed and edited by Zappa in his Utility Muffin Research Kitchen home studio, prepared for the compact disc format. The albums were remixed and reedited, and are substantially different from their original releases.

The series was well received by critics, although some criticism was aimed at Zappa's alterations, most notably the decision to rerecord the rhythm sections of the albums We're Only in It for the Money and Cruising with Ruben & the Jets, which provoked a lawsuit over unpaid royalties. These are official releases #43, #46, and #49.

Background 

In the 1980s, Frank Zappa had regained the rights to the albums he had released on other labels. He decided to reissue them as part of a series of three box sets for collectors. Zappa found the quality of the original masters to be unsatisfactory for release, and decided to prepare new masters, remixing and reediting the original tapes. In the case of the albums We're Only in It for the Money and Cruising with Ruben & the Jets, Zappa decided to rerecord the rhythm tracks, overdubbing newly recorded performances by bassist Arthur Barrow and drummer Chad Wackerman. Barrow stated of the remixing, "I had mixed feelings about it. On the one hand, as a musician, I'm always happy to be employed and doing sessions is always fun. But on the other hand, I did try to talk Frank out of it the best I could." Zappa told Barrow that he did not like the original performances, by bassist Roy Estrada and drummer Jimmy Carl Black.

During this period, Zappa also prepared a remix of the second version of his 1967 album Lumpy Gravy, featuring similar overdubs by Barrow and Wackerman. An excerpt from the remix was included in an Old Masters promotional sampler intended for radio station managers, but the remix was not released at the time; it appeared on Lumpy Money in 2008.

Zappa stated in regards to the remixing of the albums, "The master tapes for Ruben and the Jets were in better shape, but since I liked the results on We're Only in it For the Money, I decided to do it on Ruben too. But those are the only two albums on which the original performances were replaced. I thought the important thing was the material itself." After the remixing was announced, a $13 million lawsuit was filed against Zappa by Jimmy Carl Black, Bunk Gardner and Don Preston, who were later joined by Ray Collins, Art Tripp and Motorhead Sherwood, increasing the claim to $16.4 million, stating that they had received no royalties from Zappa since 1969.

Zappa told interviewers that the oxide was falling off the tapes, and that he had to replace the drum and bass performances. Barrow disputed this, stating "how could the oxide be falling off the tape on one track and not on other tracks? But it's Frank's album. It's his music. He can certainly do what he likes with it. But I think it would be nice for those of us that like the original version to put that out also [...] As for Ruben & The Jets, I kinda think that's bad too. Because one of the coolest things about that album originally was the tape loops for the drums. It sounded like a machine, it was a great sound."

In addition to the new masters, Zappa prepared a "Mystery Disc" for two of the box sets, but not for the third Old Masters box. Additionally, the third box did not include the albums Zappa in New York, Sleep Dirt, Studio Tan, and Orchestral Favorites, which Zappa had prepared after Warner Bros. Records had rejected his intended release, Läther. Zappa in New York, Sleep Dirt, Studio Tan and Orchestral Favorites were subsequently released on compact disc by Barking Pumpkin, and Läther was released by Rykodisc in 1996.

All of the albums included in this set were subsequently issued on compact disc, in editions that used the masters which appeared on these boxes; the "Mystery Discs" were subsequently combined into a single release, Mystery Disc, released by Rykodisc in 1998. On this release, the tracks "Big Leg Emma" and "Why Don't You Do Me Right?" were excluded, as they had previously appeared on the compact disc edition of Absolutely Free.

Track listing 

 The Old Masters Box I
 Freak Out!
 Absolutely Free
 Lumpy Gravy
 We're Only in It for the Money
 Cruising with Ruben & the Jets
 Mystery Disc

 The Old Masters Box II
 Uncle Meat
 Hot Rats
 Burnt Weeny Sandwich
 Weasels Ripped My Flesh
 Chunga's Revenge
 Fillmore East, June 1971
 Just Another Band from L.A.
 Mystery Disc

 The Old Masters Box III
 Waka/Jawaka
 The Grand Wazoo
 Over-Nite Sensation
 Apostrophe (')
 Roxy & Elsewhere
 One Size Fits All
 Bongo Fury
 Zoot Allures

Reception 

The individual box sets were well received. Allmusic reviewer William Ruhlmann gave each box 4.5 out of 5 stars. However, the remixing of the albums received some criticism from fans.

References 

1985 compilation albums
1986 compilation albums
1987 compilation albums
Albums produced by Frank Zappa
Barking Pumpkin Records albums
Compilation album series
Frank Zappa compilation albums